Oliver deGray Vanderbilt, Jr. (August 23, 1884 – January 26, 1960) was an All-American basketball player at Princeton University in 1904–05. He was part of the first group of college basketball players to be honored as such. The Helms Athletic Foundation, which began in 1936, retroactively named the All-American teams from 1905 to 1935. Between 1905 and 1929, the Helms All-American teams are considered to be consensus selections.

References

1884 births
1960 deaths
All-American college men's basketball players
Basketball players from New Jersey
Basketball players from Cincinnati
Princeton Tigers men's basketball players
Sportspeople from Brick Township, New Jersey
American men's basketball players
Sportspeople from Ocean County, New Jersey